Deh-e Nazar Isa Zahi (also Romanized as Deh-e Naz̧ar ‘Īsā Zahī; also known as Naz̧ar Sharīf) is a village in Margan Rural District, in the Central District of Hirmand County, Sistan and Baluchestan Province, Iran. At the 2006 census, its population was 104, with 20 families.

References 

Populated places in Hirmand County